Edward Bożek (born 21 March 1937) is a Polish sprinter. He competed in the men's 4 × 400 metres relay at the 1960 Summer Olympics.

References

1937 births
Living people
Athletes (track and field) at the 1960 Summer Olympics
Polish male sprinters
Olympic athletes of Poland
Place of birth missing (living people)